Pavel Kaška (born 25 May 1988) is a Czech figure skater. He is the 2012 Merano Cup silver medalist, 2010 NRW Trophy bronze medalist, and 2009 Czech national champion.

Kaška was coached by Miloslav Man from the age of ten until about 2010. Since 2011, he is coached by Vlasta Kopřivová.

Programs

Competitive highlights
GP: Grand Prix; JGP: Junior Grand Prix

References

External links 

 

Czech male single skaters
1988 births
Living people
Figure skaters from Prague
Competitors at the 2015 Winter Universiade
Competitors at the 2011 Winter Universiade
Competitors at the 2009 Winter Universiade
Competitors at the 2013 Winter Universiade